Haridasu goes from house to house singing songs. The people of Andhra Pradesh believe that Haridasu's melodious rendition of Sundarakanda or Bhagavatam on Sankranti brings new auspicious beginning in their lives.

Haridasu was a very professional sanskrit scholar, successors were now currently working as a prime priest in BHADRACHALAM RAMA MANDIR, Telangana.

A cultural theory :- 
Haridasu is a typical brahmin where Haridasu performs the rituals of death ceremony, widow Pooja etc.. which is considered as a low categorized work.hence, haridasu is now considered as a low caste of shudras from varna system

precedents view :- 
There are two brothers who go for a Pooja ritual, where one of them ate the offerings of Kachcha food (food cooked in water), which was considered as pollutant food by bhramin and then he was not allowed to do regular rituals 
The one who consumed the polluted food is Haridasu.

References 

Culture of Andhra Pradesh